Lenovo IdeaPhone A820 is a dual-SIM, quad-core MediaTek MT6589 based smartphone belonging to the A series which is an entry-level group of Lenovo mobile communication products. It has been introduced to the market in March 2013.

Design and features

The phone supports 900 MHz, 1800 MHz, 1900 MHz GSM bands as well as 900 MHz and 2100 MHz UMTS frequencies using GRPS, EDGE, HSDPA, HSUPA, HSPA and HSPA+ technology.

The CPU is Mediatek MT6589 1.2 GHz quad-core processor.

It has 4.5 inch IPS screen with a qHD resolution of 540x960 px displaying up to 16M colors and covered with a multitouch (up to 5 touch points) panel.

Graphics is run by an incorporated Imagination PowerVR SGX544 GPU.

RAM memory is 1 GB, internal eMMC memory size is 4 GiB, out of which 2.18 GiB is available as an internal SD card.
Additionally, the smartphone supports external microSD/microSDHC card of a capacity up to 32 GiB.

The Li-Ion battery capacity is 2000 mAh.

The phone dimensions are 135 x 68.2 x 9.9 mm (5.32 x 2.68 x 0.39 inch) with the weight being 145 g (5.11 oz).

Stock A820 is running Android 4.1.2 Jelly Bean operating system, although unofficial alternative ROMs exist using various Android OS versions.

Reviews

Lenovo A820 received a very warm reception across the world, despite the fact that it is directly available only in China, India, Indonesia, Russia, the Philippines, and Vietnam.
In a review for Mobile Network Comparison the author summarized that Lenovo A820 "offers incomparable value compared to almost any phone available on British high streets".
It is criticized basically only for a lack of LED flash and a local Chinese stock ROM without multilingual and Google Play Store support.

References

IdeaPhone A820
Android (operating system) devices
Mobile phones introduced in 2013
Mobile phones with user-replaceable battery
Discontinued smartphones